The Archdiocese of Oviedo is an Archdiocese of the Roman Catholic Church in Spain. The archdiocese encompasses roughly the current autonomous community of Asturias or Principality of Asturias. Erected in the 9th century, the diocese was elevated to an archdiocese in 1954. The diocesan see is in the city of Oviedo, where the Catedral de San Salvador is located.

History
 811: Established as Diocese of Oviedo
 27 October 1954: Promoted as Metropolitan Archdiocese of Oviedo

Suffragan dioceses
 Astorga
 León
 Santander

Special churches
Minor Basilicas:
 Basilica of Santa María la Real, Covadonga
 Basilica of Santa María Magdalena, Cangas del Narcea
 Basilica-Sanctuary of Sagrado Corazón, Gijón
 Basilica of Santa Maria de la Asunción de Llanes, Llanes
World Heritage Churches
 Basilica of San Julián de los Prados, Oviedo
 Church of San Miguel de Lillo, Oviedo
 Church of Santa Cristina de Lena, Lena
 Church of Santa María del Naranco, Oviedo

Leadership

Before 17th century

Since the 17th century

See also
Roman Catholicism in Spain

External links
1871 diocesan calendar of saints

Sources

 GCatholic.org
 Catholic Hierarchy
 Archdiocese website

Roman Catholic Archdiocese of Oviedo
Roman Catholic dioceses in Spain
Dioceses established in the 9th century